Cleburne County is a county located in the U.S. state of Arkansas. As of the 2020 census, the population was 24,711. The county seat and most populous city is Heber Springs. The county was formed on February 20, 1883, as the last of Arkansas's 75 counties to be formed. It is named for Confederate Major-General Patrick Cleburne. Cleburne is an alcohol prohibition or dry county.

Geography
Much of the water area in the County includes Greers Ferry Lake, which extends westward into neighboring Van Buren County.

Major highways

 Arkansas Highway 5
 Arkansas Highway 16
 Arkansas Highway 25
 Arkansas Highway 25B
 Arkansas Highway 25S
 Arkansas Highway 87
 Arkansas Highway 92
 Arkansas Highway 107
 Arkansas Highway 110
 Arkansas Highway 124
 Arkansas Highway 210
Arkansas Highway 225
 Arkansas Highway 263
 Arkansas Highway 336
 Arkansas Highway 337
 Arkansas Highway 356
 Arkansas Highway 980

Adjacent counties
 Stone County (north)
 Independence County (northeast)
 White County (southeast)
 Faulkner County (southwest)
 Van Buren County (west)

Demographics

2020 census

As of the 2020 United States census, there were 24,711 people, 10,783 households, and 7,230 families residing in the county.

2000 census
As of the 2000 census, there were 24,046 people, 10,190 households, and 7,408 families residing in the county.  The population density was 44 people per square mile (17/km2).  There were 13,732 housing units at an average density of 25 per square mile (10/km2).  The racial makeup of the county was 98.20% White, 0.12% Black or African American, 0.47% Native American, 0.15% Asian, 0.02% Pacific Islander, 0.15% from other races, and 0.89% from two or more races.  1.17% of the population were Hispanic or Latino of any race.

There were 10,190 households, out of which 26.30% had children under the age of 18 living with them, 61.70% were married couples living together, 7.90% had a female householder with no husband present, and 27.30% were non-families. 24.40% of all households were made up of individuals, and 12.30% had someone living alone who was 65 years of age or older.  The average household size was 2.33 and the average family size was 2.74.

In the county, the population was spread out, with 21.30% under the age of 18, 6.60% from 18 to 24, 24.10% from 25 to 44, 26.90% from 45 to 64, and 21.10% who were 65 years of age or older.  The median age was 44 years. For every 100 females there were 93.90 males.  For every 100 females age 18 and over, there were 92.50 males.

The median income for a household in the county was $31,531, and the median income for a family was $37,273. Males had a median income of $28,844 versus $19,672 for females. The per capita income for the county was $17,250.  About 9.00% of families and 13.10% of the population were below the poverty line, including 17.10% of those under age 18 and 11.90% of those age 65 or over.

Government

Despite being a typical Solid South county for most of its history, voting overwhelmingly for Democratic candidates, Cleburne County has trended heavily towards the GOP in recent decades. As of 2020, the last Democrat to carry this county was Bill Clinton in 1996.

Communities

Cities
 Fairfield Bay (mostly in Van Buren County)
 Greers Ferry
 Heber Springs (county seat)
 Quitman (partly in Faulkner County)

Towns
 Concord
 Higden

Census-designated place
Tumbling Shoals

Other unincorporated communities
 Drasco

Townships

 California
 Center Post
 Clayton
 East Peter Creek
 Francis
 Giles (Greers Ferry)
 Grassey (Concord)
 Healing Springs
 Heber (most of Heber Springs)
 McJester
 Morgan (part of Fairfield Bay)
 Mountain
 North Cadron (part of Quitman)
 Pickens
 Pine
 Piney
 Poff
 Saline (Higden)
 South Cadron (part of Quitman)
 Sugar Camp
 Sugar Loaf
 Valley (part of Heber Springs)
 West Peter Creek (Tumbling Shoals)
 Wilburn

See also
 List of lakes in Cleburne County, Arkansas
 National Register of Historic Places listings in Cleburne County, Arkansas
List of counties in Arkansas

References

 
1883 establishments in Arkansas
Populated places established in 1883